"Round About Way" is a song written by Steve Dean and Wil Nance, and recorded by the American country music singer George Strait. It was released in January 1998 as the fourth and final single from his CD Carrying Your Love With Me. The song reached No. 1 on Billboard’s Hot Country Singles & Tracks chart.  

The song's B-side, "She'll Leave You with a Smile", is a different song from the single "She'll Leave You with a Smile", included on Strait's album The Road Less Traveled.

Critical reception
Larry Flick, of Billboard magazine, reviewed the song favorably, saying that "fiddle and steel guitar dominate this uptempo romp." He goes on to say that Strait's performance is "packed with personality."

Chart positions
"Round About Way" re-entered the U.S. Billboard Hot Country Singles & Tracks as an official single at number 45 for the week of January 10, 1998.

Year-end charts

References

1998 singles
1996 songs
George Strait songs
Song recordings produced by Tony Brown (record producer)
MCA Nashville Records singles
Songs written by Steve Dean